

Champions

Major League Baseball
World Series: New York Mets over Boston Red Sox (4–3); Ray Knight, MVP

American League Championship Series MVP: Marty Barrett
National League Championship Series MVP: Mike Scott
All-Star Game, July 15 at the Astrodome: American League, 3–2; Roger Clemens, MVP

Other champions
Amateur World Series: Cuba
Caribbean World Series: Águilas de Mexicali (Mexico)
College World Series: Arizona
Cuban National Series: Industriales
Japan Series: Seibu Lions over Hiroshima Toyo Carp (4-3-1)
Korean Series: Haitai Tigers over Samsung Lions
Big League World Series: Maracaibo, Venezuela
Junior League World Series: Waldorf, Maryland
Little League World Series: Tainan Park, Taiwan
Senior League World Series: Taipei, Taiwan

Awards and honors
Baseball Hall of Fame
Bobby Doerr
Ernie Lombardi
Willie McCovey
Most Valuable Player
Roger Clemens, Boston Red Sox (AL)
Mike Schmidt, Philadelphia Phillies (NL)
Cy Young Award
Roger Clemens, Boston Red Sox (AL)
Mike Scott, Houston Astros (NL)
Rookie of the Year
Jose Canseco, Oakland Athletics (AL)
Todd Worrell, St. Louis Cardinals (NL)
Rolaids Relief Man of the Year Award
Dave Righetti, New York Yankees (AL)
Todd Worrell, St. Louis Cardinals (NL)
Manager of the Year Award
John McNamara, Boston Red Sox (AL)
Hal Lanier, Houston Astros (NL)
Gold Glove Award
Don Mattingly (1B) (AL) 
Frank White (2B) (AL) 
Gary Gaetti (3B) (AL) 
Tony Fernández (SS) (AL) 
Kirby Puckett (OF) (AL) 
Gary Pettis (OF) (AL) 
Jesse Barfield (OF) (AL)
Bob Boone (C) (AL) 
Ron Guidry (P) (AL)

MLB statistical leaders

Major league baseball final standings

Draft

Events

January
January 8 – Willie McCovey is the only player elected this year to the Hall of Fame by the Baseball Writers' Association of America, and becomes the 16th player elected in his first year of eligibility. Billy Williams falls four votes shy of the 319 needed for election.

February
February 28 – Baseball Commissioner Peter Ueberroth suspended 11 players who had testified to cocaine involvement in the Pittsburgh drug trials of 1985.

March
March 10 – Ernie Lombardi, the National League MVP in 1938, and Bobby Doerr, a nine-time American League All-Star, are elected to the Hall of Fame by the Special Veterans Committee.
March 13 – At spring training, the father-and-son team of Hal and Brian McRae appears together in an exhibition game for the Kansas City Royals. Brian, who will be sent back to the minor leagues before the start of the season, will not make his major league debut until the 1990 season. In 1991, Brian will play for his father, when he takes over as Royals manager.

April
April 2 – An opening day crowd of 52,922, the largest crowd in Memorial Stadium regular season history goes home disappointed as The Cleveland Indians and their winning pitcher Ken Schrom beats the Baltimore Orioles and their losing pitcher Mike Flanagan 6–4.
April 8 – Former New York Yankee player Lou Piniella makes his managerial debut and guides the Yankees to a 4–2 victory over the Kansas City Royals (for whom Piniella played from –) at Yankee Stadium.
April 29 – Boston Red Sox pitcher Roger Clemens strikes out 20 Seattle Mariners and becomes the first pitcher in major league history to strike out 20 players in a nine-inning game in a 3–1 Red Sox victory.  Meanwhile, Mario Soto of the Cincinnati Reds became the 11th pitcher in major league history to surrender four home runs in an inning in a 7–4 loss to the Montreal Expos.  Andre Dawson, Hubie Brooks, Tim Wallach, and Mike Fitzgerald all connected.

May
May 1 – The Atlanta Braves ended the New York Mets' record tying 11-game winning streak 7-2. Some Braves experts call it the highlight of the Braves' 1986 season. The Braves hit 4 home runs by 3 different players including 1978 NL Rookie of the Year Bob Horner.
May 2 – The Texas Rangers beat the New York Yankees 7-4. Even worse, Yankees manager Lou Pinella was suspended 2 games for his run-in with umpire Tim Tschida. The Yankees still had a 14-7 record and first place in the Al East.
May 3 – The Lou Pinella less Yankees beat the Texas Rangers 9-4 as Don Mattingly tied a major League record with three sacrifice flys, while Rickey Henderson scored four runs.

June
June   4 – Pitching at Atlanta–Fulton County Stadium, Atlanta Braves pitcher Craig McMurtry gives up Barry Bonds his first major league career home run.
June 13 – Los Angeles Dodgers pitcher Fernando Valenzuela and catcher Alex Treviño form the first Mexican battery in Major League history.
June 18 – California Angels pitcher Don Sutton records his 300th career win.
June 21 – In a move that shocks many, reigning Heisman Trophy winner Vincent "Bo" Jackson announces that he will forego dealing with the Tampa Bay Buccaneers, who had made him the first overall selection of the National Football League Draft, and signs a contract to play baseball with the Kansas City Royals.

July
July 6 – First baseman Bob Horner of the Atlanta Braves becomes the eleventh player in major league history to hit four home runs in one game.  Besides, Horner joined Ed Delahanty as the second player to do so in a losing effort, as his Braves fall to the Montréal Expos,  11–8, at Fulton County Stadium.
July 15 – At the Houston Astrodome, the American League wins the All-Star Game 3–2, for its second triumph in the last 15 years. AL starter Roger Clemens pitches three perfect innings to win the Game's MVP Award.  The game turns out to be the last major league game ever managed by the defending World Series champion Kansas City Royals' manager Dick Howser.  Howser, who admitted he felt sick before the game, is diagnosed with a brain tumor and undergoes surgery.  Mike Ferraro takes over as Royals manager for the remainder of the season.
July 22 – New York Mets third baseman Ray Knight incited a bench-clearing brawl at Riverfront Stadium against his former teammates, the Cincinnati Reds. Eric Davis, pinch-running for Reds player/manager Pete Rose in the tenth inning, stole second and third base. Knight took the throw from Mets catcher Gary Carter late, brought his glove to Davis' face and knocked his helmet off. A stare-off ensued, followed by a right cross from Knight. The benches emptied and as a result of all the ejections from this fight, Mets manager brought back-up catcher Ed Hearn into the game, and moved Carter from behind the plate to third. Roger McDowell replaced Jesse Orosco on the mound, and Orosco went into right field. They traded positions with two outs in the eleventh, and McDowell traded positions with left fielder Mookie Wilson with one out in the 12th. This rotation continued for the remainder of the game, which the Mets won in fourteen innings.
July 29 – Sparky Anderson of the Detroit Tigers becomes the first in baseball to achieve 600 career wins as a manager in both the American and National League.

August
August 1 – Bert Blyleven of the Minnesota Twins records his 3000th career strikeout. In the same game, his teammate Kirby Puckett hits for the cycle for the only time in his career.
August 5 
At Candlestick Park, San Francisco Giants southpaw Steve Carlton strikes out Eric Davis in the third inning of a game against the Cincinnati Reds. As a result, Carlton accomplished another pitching milestone in his illustrious career, while becoming just the second major league pitcher, after Nolan Ryan, to reach the 4,000 strikeouts mark.
Rookie Jim Traber and Larry Sheets hit consecutive home runs that capped a five-run third inning and Storm Davis continued his mastery over Texas as the Baltimore Orioles routed the Texas Rangers, 9-2 and put the team within 2.5 games of first place Boston Red Sox, but that would be the last piece of glory as the Orioles would collapse and finish 73-89, Earl Weaver's only losing season as Orioles manager.
August 10 – Billy Martin has his number 1 retired by the New York Yankees.
August 11 – Cincinnati player-manager Pete Rose, 45, singled four times and doubled to set an NL record with the 10th five-hit game of his career. Rose drove in three runs in a 13–4 loss to the San Francisco Giants, to move one ahead of Max Carey for the record.
August 12 – Don Baylor of the Boston Red Sox set an AL record when he was hit by a pitch for the 25th time that season, breaking the record he shared with Bill Freehan (1968) and Norm Elberfeld (1911). Kansas City's Bud Black was the pitcher as the Royals completed a doubleheader sweep with a 6–5 victory.
August 14 – Pete Rose enjoys a 3-for-4 day, the last hit being the 4,256th and final hit of his career.
August 17 – Pete Rose inserts himself in as a pinch hitter, and takes a called third strike from San Diego Padres pitcher Goose Gossage to end a 9–5 loss for the Cincinnati Reds. It is Rose's final plate appearance (15,890), at-bat (14,503), and game (3,562), all of which are Major League career records.
August 19 – In a trade that would go on to benefit the Red Sox this season (especially the postseason) the Sox send shortstop Rey Quiñones and cash to the Seattle Mariners for outfielder Dave Henderson and shortstop Spike Owen.
August 20 – Two no-hit bids are broken up in the ninth. Against the San Francisco Giants at Candlestick Park, Philadelphia Phillies pitcher Don Carman has a perfect game broken up by a Bob Brenly double leading off the ninth. The Phillies win 1–0 in 10 innings on a Juan Samuel home run; Steve Bedrosian relieves Carman in the bottom of the tenth and retires the Giants in order. Against the California Angels at Tiger Stadium hours later, Walt Terrell of the Detroit Tigers has his no-hit bid foiled with two outs in the ninth by a Wally Joyner double, the only hit he will allow in a 3–0 victory. This is the second time this season Joyner has broken up a no-hit bid in the ninth inning; against the Texas Rangers on June 16, he had foiled Charlie Hough's bid for a no-hitter with one out in the ninth.
August 27 – Darryl Strawberry hits his 100th career home run helping the New York Mets beat the San Diego Padres 6–5.
August 29 – A game between the Montreal Expos and San Diego Padres is postponed after two 200-pound oxygen cylinders explode inside the unfinished Olympic Stadium tower.

September
September 3 – Billy Hatcher hit a home run in the top of the 18th inning to give the Houston Astros an 8–7 victory over the Chicago Cubs. The two teams began with 14 innings one day earlier, and use a major league record 53 players in the game.
September 14 : 
Bo Jackson slugs his first major league home run – a 475-foot blast believed to be the longest to date at Royals Stadium –, leading the Kansas City Royals to a 10–3 victory over the Seattle Mariners.
San Francisco Giants third baseman Bob Brenly, usually a catcher, ties a major league record by making four errors in just one inning. But Brenly redeemed later by hitting two home runs, including the game-winner, as San Francisco beats the Atlanta Braves, 7–6.
September 17 – The New York Mets secure the National League East title with a 4–2 win over the visiting Chicago Cubs, for their 95th victory of the season. The Mets would finish the season at 108–54, the best record of any team during the 1980s.
September 22 – Fernando Valenzuela of the Los Angeles Dodgers becomes the first Mexican pitcher to have a 20-win season in the majors, beating the Houston Astros, 9–2, while allowing just two hits.
September 25 – Houston Astros pitching ace Mike Scott hurls a 2–0 no-hitter against the San Francisco Giants at the Houston Astrodome. The victory clinches the National League West title for the Astros.
September 26 – An 8–3 win for the California Angels against the host Texas Rangers, gives the franchise its third American League West crown.
September 28 – The Boston Red Sox claim the American League East championship with a 12–3 drubbing of the Toronto Blue Jays at Fenway Park.

October
October 4 – At the Hubert H. Humphrey Metrodome, Greg Gagne of the Minnesota Twins hits two inside-the-park home runs in a 7–3 victory over the Chicago White Sox. In the same game, Bert Blyleven – who goes the distance for the victory – gives up his 50th home run of the season (to Daryl Boston) to set a Major League record.  Coincidentally, Blyleven had given up Dick Allen's two inside-the-park home runs in a July 31,  game against the White Sox — the last game prior to this one in which one player hit two inside-the-park home runs. That game had been played in the Metrodome's predecessor, Metropolitan Stadium.
October 5 - In the season's final day, The Mets beat The Pittsburgh Pirates 9–0 at Shea Stadium for their 108th game of the year. The team set franchise records for wins, home wins (55), road wins (53), home runs (148) a far cry from a team that hit 61 home runs in 1980, batting average (.263) and attendance (2,762,417) all for a team that this year is celebrating its 25th anniversary.
October 12 – In Game 5 of the American League Championship Series, the Boston Red Sox, trailing 3 games to 1 to the California Angels and two outs away from elimination, are rescued when Don Baylor delivers a two-run home run off Mike Witt to trim the Angel lead from 5–2 to 5–4.  After Witt retires Dwight Evans for the second out, Gary Lucas relieves him and promptly hits Rich Gedman with his first (and only) pitch.  Donnie Moore then relieves Lucas and, with one strike away from elimination, Dave Henderson crushes a pitch from Moore into the center field stands for a 6–5 lead. The Red Sox win 7–6 in extra innings (a Henderson sacrifice fly providing the winning run) and extend the series to another game.
October 15 – In the longest game in post-season history (until the 2005 National League Division Series), the Mets beat the Astros 7–6 in 16 innings to earn their first trip to the World Series since 1973. New York scores three runs in the top of the 9th to force extra innings. The Mets score three more runs in the top of the 16th, and Houston answers with two of its own before Jesse Orosco fans Kevin Bass to end the game.
October 25 – With the Red Sox leading 5–3 in Game 6 of the World Series, and just one out away from winning their first championship since 1918, the Red Sox give up hits to Gary Carter, Kevin Mitchell and Ray Knight, and pitcher Bob Stanley throws a wild pitch that allows Mitchell to score. Then Mookie Wilson hits a slow grounder that keeps bouncing, right between the legs of first baseman Bill Buckner, allowing Knight to score to give the New York Mets an improbable 6–5 win. Boston's  Calvin Schiraldi absorbs the loss.
October 27 – At Shea Stadium, the New York Mets win Game Seven of the World Series over the Boston Red Sox, 8–5. Third baseman Ray Knight is named the Series MVP.

November
November 12 – Roger Clemens of the Boston Red Sox wins the American League Cy Young Award unanimously, joining Denny McLain as the only pitchers to do so. Clemens finished with a 24–4 record with 238 strikeouts and a 2.48 ERA.
November 19 – Philadelphia Phillies third baseman Mike Schmidt wins the National League MVP Award, joining Stan Musial and Roy Campanella as the only three-time NL award winners. Schmidt led the NL with 37 home runs and 119 RBI while hitting a .290 average.
November 24:
The Minnesota Twins announce interim manager Tom Kelly will be their new skipper for the 1987 season. Kelly, who replaced Ray Miller late in the season, will compile a losing record (1140–1244) in his career, but wins two World Championships during his 16-year tenure as the Twins manager.
St. Louis Cardinals reliever Todd Worrell, who led the National League with 36 saves, receives the Rookie of the Year honors. Worrell had helped St. Louis to the 1985 World Series as a late-season call-up but was still a rookie the next season as defined by the BBWAA.
November 25 – Jose Canseco of the Oakland Athletics, who hit .240 with 33 home runs and 117 RBI, wins the American League Rookie of the Year Award with 16 of 28 first place votes, with the others going to Wally Joyner of the California Angels (.290, 22, 100). Canseco's .240 batting average is the lowest ever for a Rookie of the Year position player.

December
December 16 – San Diego Padres pitcher LaMarr Hoyt is sentenced to 45 days in jail following his third arrest on drug possession charges, this time on the U.S.-Mexico border. Baseball Commissioner Peter Ueberroth bars Hoyt from baseball on February 25, . An arbitrator cut Hoyt's suspension to sixty days in mid-June and ordered the Padres to reinstate him. The Padres, however, gave him his unconditional release the following day.

Births

January
January 1 – Nick Hagadone
January 5 – J. P. Arencibia
January 8 – James Russell
January 16 – Reid Brignac
January 16 – Mark Trumbo
January 20 – David Lough
January 24 – Andy Dirks
January 24 – Tyler Flowers
January 24 – Franklin Morales
January 27 – Yohan Flande
January 28 – Brandon Guyer
January 28 – Nate Jones
January 29 – Jair Jurrjens
January 30 – Nick Evans
January 30 – Jordan Pacheco
January 30 – Mark Rogers

February
February 1 – Kristopher Negron
February 1 – Justin Sellers
February 3 – Lucas Duda
February 4 – Jordan Smith
February 5 – Ryan Webb
February 6 – Kanekoa Texeira
February 7 – Josh Collmenter
February 8 – Matt Bush
February 9 – Josh Judy
February 10 – Dalier Hinojosa
February 10 – Duke Welker
February 12 – Brandon Allen
February 12 – Todd Frazier
February 15 – Johnny Cueto
February 15 – Fautino de los Santos
February 19 – Michael Schwimer
February 20 – Julio Borbon
February 26 – Erik Cordier
February 27 – Yovani Gallardo
February 27 – James Parr

March
March 3 – Eric Farris
March 6 – Jake Arrieta
March 6 – Francisco Cervelli
March 6 – Ross Detwiler
March 11 – Jeremy Hefner
March 12 – Joey Butler
March 16 – Mickey Storey
March 17 – Chris Davis
March 21 – Carlos Monasterios
March 22 – Dexter Fowler
March 27 – Johnny Monell
March 28 – Brad Emaus
March 28 – Steve Susdorf
March 30 – Barry Enright

April
April 4 – Louis Coleman
April 5 – Steve Clevenger
April 7 – Chia-Jen Lo
April 8 – Félix Hernández
April 8 – Eddie Kunz
April 8 – Carlos Santana
April 9 – Bryan Petersen
April 10 – Corey Kluber
April 11 – Russ Canzler
April 11 – Charlie Furbush
April 12 – Brad Brach
April 13 – Lorenzo Cain
April 14 – Cory Gearrin
April 18 – Billy Butler
April 20 – Donovan Hand
April 20 – Jess Todd
April 23 – Luis Durango
April 24 – Aaron Cunningham
April 28 – Dillon Gee
April 28 – Daniel Moskos

May
May 3 – Homer Bailey
May 6 – Matt Langwell
May 9 – Daniel Schlereth
May 10 – Luke Putkonen
May 10 – Matt Tuiasosopo
May 13 – John Ely
May 14 – Efren Navarro
May 14 – Jackson Williams
May 15 – Brandon Barnes
May 19 – Joe Paterson
May 21 – Matt Wieters
May 22 – Collin Cowgill
May 22 – Eric Sogard
May 23 – Jordan Zimmermann
May 30 – Tony Campana

June
June 2 – Chris Martin
June 3 – Zach Lutz
June 6 – Collin Balester
June 6 – Junichi Tazawa
June 8 – Ángel Salomé
June 10 – Al Alburquerque
June 13 – Jonathan Lucroy
June 15 – Trevor Plouffe
June 15 – Sean West
June 17 – Quinn Wolcott
June 18 – Steve Cishek
June 18 – Caleb Joseph
June 24 – Phil Hughes
June 25 – Bobby LaFromboise
June 26 – Michael Kohn
June 26 – Lou Marson
June 29 – Tom Koehler
June 30 – Mike Carp

July
July 1 – Charles Blackmon
July 2 – Brett Cecil
July 2 – Oliver Marmol
July 2 – Rene Tosoni
July 3 – Tommy Hunter
July 8 – Jaime García
July 10 – Byung-ho Park
July 11 – Bryan Augenstein
July 12 – Nick Vincent
July 23 – Andrew Carignan
July 24 – Scott Van Slyke
July 24 – Miguel Socolovich
July 26 – Elih Villanueva
July 27 – Ryan Flaherty
July 28 – Darin Ruf
July 30 – Scott Diamond

August
August 4 – Alex Castellanos
August 6 – Jake McGee
August 7 – Jordan Danks
August 11 – Colby Rasmus
August 11 – Pablo Sandoval
August 16 – Yu Darvish
August 16 – Martín Maldonado
August 18 – Tony Cruz
August 18 – Evan Gattis
August 18 – Andrew Taylor
August 19 – Austin Adams
August 21 – Erik Hamren
August 24 – Nick Adenhart
August 26 – Xavier Cedeño
August 26 – Luis Marte
August 26 – Brett Wallace
August 27 – Jordy Mercer
August 28 – Tommy Hanson
August 31 – Juan Nicasio

September
September 1 – Brian Broderick
September 2 – Evan Crawford
September 3 – Brandon Beachy
September 4 – Jordan Schafer
September 4 – Michael Stutes
September 8 – Logan Schafer
September 9 – Michael Bowden
September 11 – Kyle Blanks
September 11 – Andrew Cashner
September 11 – Pat Hoberg
September 12 – Steve Garrison
September 12 – Kyle Weiland
September 16 – Gordon Beckham
September 18 – Michael Kirkman
September 19 – Manabu Mima
September 19 – Anthony Vasquez
September 20 – A. J. Ramos
September 21 – Zach Phillips
September 22 – Arcenio León
September 22 – Chris Schwinden
September 23 – Miguel González
September 23 – Chris Volstad
September 26 – Sean Doolittle
September 27 – Vin Mazzaro
September 27 – Matt Shoemaker
September 28 – Zach Stewart
September 30 – James Hoyt
September 30 – Edward Paredes

October
October 1 – Aaron Poreda
October 4 – Stephen Fife
October 5 – Jeff Bianchi
October 5 – Tanner Roark
October 6 – Edgmer Escalona
October 8 – Adron Chambers
October 8 – Erik Davis
October 9 – Derek Holland
October 9 – David Phelps
October 9 – Chaz Roe
October 10 – Andrew McCutchen
October 12 – Trevor Bell
October 17 – Dan Butler
October 19 – Daniel Descalso
October 21 – C. C. Lee
October 22 – Justin Freeman
October 22 – Chris Rusin
October 27 – Pedro Beato
October 27 – Jon Niese
October 28 – Josh Thole
October 30 – Desmond Jennings

November
November 1 – Rhiner Cruz
November 2 – Taylor Green
November 3 – Alex Wilson
November 10 – Aaron Crow
November 10 – Eric Thames
November 13 – Josh Bell
November 13 – Wade Miley
November 13 – Juan Pérez
November 13 – Bryan Price
November 17 – Everth Cabrera
November 19 – Michael Saunders
November 20 – Alex Guerrero
November 22 – Chris Dominguez
November 23 – Brandon Snyder
November 24 – Dean Anna

December
December 1 – A. J. Morris
December 5 – Tim Kennelly
December 5 – Justin Smoak
December 6 – Ryan Tucker
December 8 – Jordan Norberto
December 10 – Matt Clark
December 10 – Pedro Florimón
December 15 – Nick Buss
December 16 – Bryan Anderson
December 16 – Alcides Escobar
December 16 – Ryan Lollis 
December 17 – Josh Edgin
December 18 – Chris Carter
December 25 – Waldis Joaquin
December 31 – Nate Freiman

Deaths

January
January   1 – Bill Hall, 57, backup catcher who played for the Pittsburgh Pirates over part of three seasons spanning 1954–1958.
January   2 – Bob Finley, 70, catcher for the Philadelphia Phillies during the 1943 and 1944 seasons.
January   2 – Bill Veeck, 71, principal owner of the Cleveland Indians (1946–1949), St. Louis Browns (1951–1953) and Chicago White Sox (1959–1961 and 1976–1980); broke the American League's color barrier by signing Larry Doby in 1947 and brought Cleveland its second-ever World Series title in 1948; perhaps best remembered for the wacky promotions he used to draw crowds and entertain fans at the ballpark, which included using midget Eddie Gaedel in a 1951 Browns game, and installing fireworks in the Comiskey Park scoreboard; elected to Baseball Hall of Fame in 1991.
January   3 – Chico Hernández, 70, Cuban backup catcher who played from 1942 to 1943 for the Chicago Cubs. 
January   4 – Dave Morey, 96, a five-sport star at Dartmouth College and  Major League Baseball pitcher for the Philadelphia Athletics in 1913, who later became a prominent coach of football and baseball at the Lowell Technological Institute, Middlebury College, Auburn University, Fordham University and Bates College in the period between 1916 and 1939. 
January   7 – Joe Burns, 85, catcher who played eight games for the 1924 Chicago White Sox.
January 10 – Roy Johnson, 90, pitcher in ten games for 1918 Philadelphia Athletics who became a minor league manager; longtime employee of the Chicago Cubs as a coach (1935–1939, 1944–1953) and scout; interim manager of Cubs for one game (May 3, 1944).
January 11 – Grover Resinger, 70, minor-league player and manager who was an MLB coach for the Atlanta Braves, Chicago White Sox, Detroit Tigers and California Angels for all or part of seven seasons between 1966 and 1976.
January 12 – Eddie Solomon, 34, trustworthy relief pitcher who played for the Los Angeles Dodgers, Chicago Cubs, St. Louis Cardinals, Atlanta Braves, Pittsburgh Pirates and Chicago White Sox over ten seasons spanning 1973–1982.
January 13 – Mike Garcia, 62, three-time All-Star pitcher who played for three teams in 14 seasons from 1948–1961, mostly with the Cleveland Indians in a span of 12 years, winning 142 games for the Indians, including 20 or more wins and leading the American League in earned run average twice each, being also a member of their storied 'Big Four' pitching rotation in its 1954 season, along with Bob Feller, Bob Lemon and Early Wynn, as they started 147 of the 156 games of the team, while posting a collective record of 93–36 and 2.85 ERA, guiding the Indians to the World Series for the first time in six years and the third in 34 years.
January 15 – Fred Thomas, 93, third baseman for three American League clubs from 1918 to 1920, who was also a member of the 1918 World Series Champion Red Sox and a World War I veteran.
January 24 – John Boozer, 47, pitcher for the Philadelphia Phillies over seven seasons between 1962 and 1969, who has the distinction of being one of only four Major League Baseball pitchers to be ejected from a game for violation of the spitball rule. 
January 28 – Tom Grubbs, 91, pitcher who played for the New York Giants in its 1920 season.

February

February 13 – Ed McGhee, 61, fourth outfielder who played with the Chicago White Sox, Philadelphia Athletics and Chicago White Sox over part of four seasons spanning 1950–1955.
February 14 – Fox Blevins, 75, third baseman for the Little Rock Grays, Homestead Grays and Oakland Larks of the Negro leagues between 1932 and 1946.
February 17 – Red Ruffing, 80, Hall of Fame and six-time All-Star pitcher who played for the Boston Red Sox, New York Yankees and Chicago White Sox in a span of 22 seasons from 1924 to 1947, whose 273 career victories included four straight 20-win seasons for the Yankees from 1936 to 1939, also helping the team win six World Series titles and going 7–2 in nine series decisions, while hitting a .269/.306/.389 slash line with 36 home runs and 273 runs batted in in 882 regular games, including at least a .303 batting average eight times.
February 20 – Bob Rice, 86, third baseman who played for the 1926 Philadelphia Phillies.
February 25 – George Susce, 78, backup catcher and longtime coach whose MLB career spanned 44 years; played sporadically (146 career games) for the Philadelphia Phillies, Detroit Tigers, Pittsburgh Pirates, St. Louis Browns and Cleveland Indians in all or parts of eight seasons between 1929 and 1944; his son pitched in the American League during the 1950s.

March
March   2
 Jocko Collins, 80, longtime scout for six MLB teams who signed players such as Dick Allen, Del Ennis and Tommy Lasorda to their first pro contracts.
 William D. Mullins, 54, pitcher in the Washington Senators minor league farm system in the 1950s.
March   3 – Paul Castner, 89, pitcher for the 1923 Chicago White Sox.
March   5 – Andy Love, 78, first baseman/outfielder who played for the Negro leagues' Detroit Stars, Washington Pilots and Harrisburg Stars between 1930 and 1943.
March   7 – Jimmy Moore, 82, outfielder who played from 1930 to 1931 for the Chicago White Sox and Philadelphia Athletics.
March 12 – Fred Hancock, 65, shortstop who played for the Chicago White Sox in 1949.
March 13 – Jack Warner, 82, third baseman whose career spanned from 1921 through 1946, including stints in the major leagues with the Detroit Tigers, Brooklyn Robins and Philadelphia Phillies during eight seasons between 1925 and 1932.
March 15 – Bill Patton, 73, backup catcher for Philadelphia Athletics in the 1935 season.   
March 24 – Hank Grampp, 82, pitcher who played for the Chicago Cubs in the 1927 and 1929 seasons.
March 25 – George Grant, 83, pitcher who played for the St. Louis Browns,  Cleveland Indians and Pittsburgh Pirates in a span of seven seasons from 1923 to 1931. 
March 26 – Mel Bosser, 72, pitcher who played for the Cincinnati Reds in the 1945 season.

April
April   9 – Dick Kokos, 58, fourth outfielder who played for the St. Louis Browns and Baltimore Orioles over part of five seasons spanning 1948–1954.
April   9 – Les Pearson, 76, outfielder who played for the 1937 St. Louis Stars of the Negro American League.
April 10 – Luther Harvel, 80, whose baseball career spanned nearly five decades, playing center field for the Cleveland Indians in 1924 and in the minor leagues in 14 seasons between 1929 and 1949, managing from 1933 to 1949, and later scouting for the Kansas City and Oakland Athletics, Cleveland Indians and Los Angeles Dodgers in a span of eight years from 1967 through 1974.
April 14 – Doc Land, 82, center fielder who played in 1929 for the Washington Senators.
April 18 – George Durning, 87, right fielder for the 1925 Philadelphia Phillies.
April 20 – Eddie Feinberg, 68, middle infielder/utility player for the Philadelphia Phillies in the 1938 and 1939 seasons.
April 27 – Marty Karow, 81, one of the finest all-around athletes in Ohio State University history during the early 1920s, who later played at shortstop and third base for the Boston Red Sox in its 1927 season.
April 28 – Pat Seerey, 63, strikeout-prone outfielder who played from 1943 through 1949 for the Cleveland Indians and Chicago White Sox; one of a select group of players who have hit four home runs in a single game, accomplishing the feat on July 18, 1948, at Shibe Park, Philadelphia, against the Athletics.
April 30 – Bill Higdon, 62, outfielder who played for the Chicago White Sox in its 1949 season.

May
May   1 – Ed Wells, 85, pitcher who played for the Detroit Tigers, New York Yankees and St. Louis Browns in all or part of eleven seasons spanning 1923–1934, posting an overall record of 68–69 and a 4.65 ERA, leading the American League in shutouts in 1926 and winning a 1932 World Series ring while pitching for the Yankees. 
May   4 – Hugh "Hal" Luby, 72, second and third baseman in 120 games with the Philadelphia Athletics (1936) and New York Giants (1944); a fixture in Pacific Coast League, principally for the Oakland Oaks and San Francisco Seals over nine seasons spanning 1938–1948, playing 866 consecutive games between 1939 and 1943; batted .296 in 2,824 minor-league games and amassed 3,165 hits, earning an induction into the Pacific Coast League Hall of Fame.
May   4 – Paul Richards, 77, catcher, manager and executive; played in 523 games over eight MLB seasons between 1932 and 1946 with the Brooklyn Dodgers, New York Giants, Philadelphia Athletics and Detroit Tigers; member of 1945 World Series champion Tigers, starting six of the series' seven games behind the plate; managed the Chicago White Sox (1951–1954 and 1976) and Baltimore Orioles (1955–1961); concurrently served as general manager (GM) of the Orioles from October 1954 through 1958, helping build the club that dominated the American League in the late 1960s and early 1970s; also helped build the Houston Colt .45s/Astros franchise as GM of the expansion team from September 1961 through 1965, then served as GM of the Atlanta Braves (1966–1972).
May   4 – Johnny Williams, 68, three-time All-Star pitcher for the Birmingham Black Barons and Cincinnati–Indianapolis Clowns of the Negro American League between 1943 and 1948.
May   6 – Len Schulte, 69, middle infielder and third baseman who played from 1944 through 1946 for the St. Louis Browns; brother of Ham Schulte.
May 14 – Frank O'Rourke, 92, Canadian ballplayer who performed at all four infield positions, primarily at third base, while debuting as the third youngest player in the National League at 17 years age, playing for six teams in part of 13 seasons spanning 1912–1931, mostly with the St. Louis Browns of the American League from 1927 to 1931, and later serving as a longtime scout for the New York Yankees, being inducted posthumously into the Canadian Baseball Hall of Fame in 1996.
May 14 – Joe Sparma, 44, pitcher who posted a 52–52 record and a 3.94 ERA for the Detroit Tigers and Montreal Expos in seven seasons from 1964 to 1970, and also a member of the 1968 World Series champion Tigers.
May 14 – Tom Turner, 69, catcher who played with the Chicago White Sox and the St. Louis Browns in five seasons from 1940 through 1944.
May 18 – Spades Wood, 77, pitcher who played from 1930 to 1931 for the Pittsburgh Pirates.
May 23 – Hugh McMullen, 84, part-time catcher for the New York Giants, Washington Senators and Cincinnati Reds over four seasons between 1925 and 1929.
May 28 – Taylor Douthit, 85, outfielder who played for the St. Louis Cardinals, Cincinnati Reds and Chicago Cubs in 11 seasons from 1923 to 1933, also a member of the 1926 World Series Champion Cardinals, whose glove is in the Baseball Hall of Fame for a record he set in 1928, when he made 547 putouts in center field for St. Louis, the most in a season by an outfielder in Major League Baseball history.
May 28 – Paul Florence, 86, backup catcher for the 1926 New York Giants, whose baseball career spanned almost 60 years, while playing 12 seasons in the minor leagues and later working as a scout and executive in the Cincinnati Reds and Houston Astros organizations.
May 31 – Dixie McArthur, 84, pitcher who played for the Pittsburgh Pirates in its 1914 season.

June
June   5 – Joe Mulligan, 72,  pitcher for the 1934 Boston Red Sox.
June   5 – Jesse Winters, 82, pitcher who played from 1919 through 1923 for the New York Giants and Philadelphia Phillies.
June   6 – John Carmichael, 83, Chicago sportswriter from 1927 to 1972, primarily for the Chicago Herald-Examiner and later for the Chicago Daily News, where he wrote his famed column, The Barber Shop, winning a J. G. Taylor Spink Award in 1974.
June   9 – Milton Richman, 64, sportswriter who spent 42 years with United Press International, being honored with the J. G. Taylor Spink Award in 1981, while receiving nominations for the Pulitzer Prize in both 1957 and 1981.
June 11 – Porter Charleston, 82, pitcher who hurled in four different Negro leagues between 1927 and 1936, notably for the Hilldale club.
June 21 – Arnie Portocarrero, 54, pitcher who played with the Philadelphia and Kansas City Athletics from 1954 to 1957 and for the Baltimore Orioles from 1958 to 1960; as a rookie, was the winningest pitcher for the Athletics, who lost 103 games that year; enjoyed his career-best season in 1958, when he won 15 games for the Orioles, fifth most wins in the American League, finishing tenth in earned run average (3.25), including three shutouts and five consecutive complete game victories.
June 24 – Loy Hanning, 68, pitcher who played for the St. Louis Browns over part of two seasons spanning 1939–1942.
June 29 – Thomas Albright, 76, Negro leagues pitcher who hurled for the 1929 Atlantic City Bacharach Giants and 1936 New York Cubans.

July
July   2 – Peanuts Lowrey, 68, former child actor who became an All-Star outfielder and third baseman; played for the Chicago Cubs, Cincinnati Reds, St. Louis Cardinals and Philadelphia Phillies through 13 seasons from 1942 to 1955, appearing in 978 games and being regarded as one of the best utility men and pinch-hitters of his generation; posted a .310 batting average and .678 OPS for the Cubs in the 1945 World Series; also performed during the 1940s in offseason exhibition games, occasionally playing alongside future Hall of Famers including Cool Papa Bell, Jimmie Foxx, Ralph Kiner, Bob Lemon, Buck Leonard, Satchel Paige and Ted Williams; spent 18 years as an MLB coach for five teams between 1960 and 1981.
July   3 – Bill McCahan, 65, pitcher who posted a 16–14 record and 3.84 ERA in 57 games for the  Philadelphia Athletics from 1946 to 1949, including a no-hitter game against the Washington Senators in 1947.
July   4 – Oscar Roettger, 86, first baseman and pitcher who played for the New York Yankees, Brooklyn Robins and Philadelphia Athletics over part of four seasons from 1923 to 1932; brother of Wally Roettger.
July   6 – Eddie Yuhas, 61, pitcher for the St. Louis Cardinals during two seasons from 1952 to 1953.
July   8 – Johnny Cooney, 85, pitcher, outfielder and first baseman for the Boston Bees and Braves, Brooklyn Dodgers and New York Yankees in 20 seasons from 1921 to 1944; a longtime coach who also managed the Braves for the final five weeks of 1949 during the medical leave of Billy Southworth; son and brother of big-league players. 
July   8 – Skeeter Webb, 76, middle infielder who played for the St. Louis Cardinals, Cleveland Indians, Chicago White Sox, Detroit Tigers, and Philadelphia Athletics over part of 12 seasons between 1932 and 1948.
July   9 – Red Lucas, 84, solid two-way pitcher and prolific pinch-hitter, who played for the New York Giants, Boston Braves, Cincinnati Reds and Pittsburgh Pirates in a span of 15 seasons from 1923 to 1938, posting a 157–135 record with a 3.72 ERA in 396 pitching appearances and amassing 204 complete games and 22 shutouts, while recording a .280 batting average and 404 hits, 114 of them in pinch-hitting duties, including three home runs.
July 10 – Harl Maggert, 72, outfielder who appeared in 66 games for the 1938 Boston Bees; his father, also an outfielder, had a brief MLB career.
July 14 – Wally Holborow, 72, pitched in 21 MLB games for the 1944–1945 Washington Senators and 1948 Philadelphia Athletics.
July 20 – Bill Steinecke, 79, catcher who played four games for 1931 Pirates but whose long minor-league career as a player and manager spanned 1925 to 1964.

July 25 – Ted Lyons, 85, Hall of Fame and All-Star pitcher who spent his entire 21-year career with the Chicago White Sox, from 1923 through 1942, and again in 1946; served in United States Marine Corps in the Pacific during wartime; compiled a 260–230 record and 3.67 ERA in 594 games for a usually mediocre team, while leading the American League in wins, innings pitched, complete games and shutouts twice each; went 22–15 with AL-leading totals of 29 complete games and  innings for a 62–92 team in 1930; completed every one of his 20 starts in 1942, at the age of 41, going 14–6 and leading the league with a 2.10 ERA; threw a no-hitter in 1926 against the Boston Red Sox at Fenway Park, which took just one hour and 45 minutes to complete; managed the White Sox from May 26, 1946 through 1948, posting a 185–245 record; then served as pitching coach of Detroit Tigers and Brooklyn Dodgers between 1949 and 1954.
July 26 – Webb Schultz, 88, pitcher who played for the 1924 Chicago White Sox.
July 27 – Bud Hafey, 73, outfielder who played for the Chicago White Sox, Pittsburgh Pirates, Cincinnati Reds and Philadelphia Phillies in a span of three seasons from 1935 to 1939.
July 28 – Cliff Melton, 74, left-handed pitcher for the New York Giants over all or part of eight seasons spanning 1937–1944; went 20–9 (2.61) as rookie for pennant-winning Giants. 
July 28 – Joe Oeschger, 94, pitcher known for his durable arm while pitching for six different teams in 12 seasons from 1914 to 1925, who shares an MLB record for the most innings pitched while playing for the Boston Braves in 1920, locked in a pitching duel with Leon Cadore of the Brooklyn Dodgers during 26 innings in a 1–1 tie eventually called because of darkness, as both pitchers had gone the distance.
July 28 – Carl Whitney, 72, outfielder who played for the New York Black Yankees and Newark Eagles of the Negro National League in 1942.
July 30 – Mickey Heath, 82, first baseman who played from 1931 to 1932 for the Cincinnati Reds.

August
August   9 – Clarence Maddern, 64, outfielder for the Chicago Cubs and Cleveland Indians over part of three seasons spanning 1946–1951.
August 11 – Tom Gorman, 67, who pitched for the New York Giants in 1939 and went on to serve as a National League umpire from 1951 to 1976, working in five World Series, five All-Star games, two NL Championship Series and nine no-hitters, before becoming a league supervisor.
August 17 – Walt Lanfranconi, 69, pitcher who played with the Chicago Cubs in 1941 and for the Boston Braves in 1947.
August 17 – Sammy Vick, 91, part-time right fielder who played for the New York Yankees and Boston Red Sox during five seasons between 1917 and 1921.
August 22 – Lamb Barbee, 70, outfielder for the 1945 Cincinnati–Indianapolis Clowns of the Negro American League.
August 22 – Charlie Eckert, 89, pitcher for the Philadelphia Athletics in a span of three seasons from 1919 to 1922.
August 23 – William Evans, 87, outfielder for seven Negro leagues clubs, including the Homestead Grays, between 1924 and 1937; great-great-uncle of Meghan Markle, Duchess of Sussex.
August 24 – George Diehl, 68, pitcher for the Boston Braves in the 1942 and 1943 seasons.

September

September   2 – Jim Wilson, 64, whose career spanned more than four decades as an MLB pitcher, scout and front-office executive; played for five teams in 12 seasons between 1945 and 1958, primarily with the Boston and Milwaukee Braves from 1951 to 1954; selected to the All-Star team three times (representing both leagues) and gained fame by pitching the first no-hitter game in Milwaukee MLB history in 1954; general manager of Milwaukee Brewers (1973–1974) and head of the MLB Scouting Bureau (1974–1985).
September   4 – Hank Greenberg, 75, Hall of Fame and five-time All-Star first baseman and left fielder who won MVP awards at both positions; member of four Detroit Tigers World Series teams which won championships in 1935 and 1945; led the American League in home runs and runs batted in four times each, including career-highs with 58 HR in 1938 and 184 RBI in 1937; won the 1945 AL pennant on last day with a grand slam, ending his career with a slash line of .313/.412/.605 with 331 homers and 1,276 RBI in 1,134 games; after finishing his playing career with the Pittsburgh Pirates in 1947, he became a front office executive, serving as farm system director (1948) and general manager (1949–1957) of Cleveland Indians and vice president/GM (1959–1961) of Chicago White Sox; held ownership stakes in Indians (1956–1957) and White Sox (1959–1961 and 1976–1980).
September 11 – Otho Nitcholas, 77, pitcher who played for the Brooklyn Dodgers in its 1945 season.
September 12 – Jim Shilling, 72, middle infielder and third baseman who divided his playing time between the Cleveland Indians and the Philadelphia Phillies in 1939.
September 14 – Gordon McLendon, 65, broadcaster and entrepreneur whose Liberty Radio Network carried his "Baseball Game of the Day" broadcasts—most of them studio recreations and many announced by McLendon, as "The Old Scotchman", himself—into small cities and towns across the U.S. between 1949 and 1952.
September 27 – Chuck Sheerin, 77, part-time infielder for the 1936 Philadelphia Phillies.
September 29 – Artie Gore, 78, National League umpire from 1947 to 1956; worked in 1,464 contests over his ten NL seasons, plus two World Series and two All-Star games.

October
October   3 – Vince DiMaggio, 74, oldest brother of Joe and Dom, two-time All-Star center fielder who played for the Boston Bees, Cincinnati Reds, Pittsburgh Pirates, Philadelphia Phillies and New York Giants in a span of ten seasons from 1935 to 1946, whose career highlights included batting 21 home runs and 100 runs batted in for the 1941 Pirates, four grand slams for the Phillies from 1945 to 1946, and collecting a home run, triple, single, a pair of runs and one RBI over three at-bats in the 1943 All-Star Game.
October   3 – Heinie Mueller, 74, who played every infield position for the Philadelphia Phillies in part of four seasons from 1938 to 1941, being best known by hitting a leadoff home run in his first major league at bat.
October   8 – Max Surkont, 64, pitcher for the Chicago White Sox, Boston and Milwaukee Braves, Pittsburgh Pirates, St. Louis Cardinals and New York Giants over nine seasons from 1949 through 1957, who set a major league record with eight consecutive strikeouts while pitching for the Braves in 1953, as the record stood until 1970, when future Hall of Famer Tom Seaver struck out ten in a row.
October   9 – Jo-Jo White, 77, starting center fielder for the Detroit Tigers teams that won the American League pennant in 1934 and the 1935 World Series, who also played for the Philadelphia Athletics and Cincinnati Reds and later coached for five teams from 1959 through 1969, including a brief stint as a manager with Cleveland Indians in August 1960; father of Mike White.
October 10 – Russ Van Atta, 80, pitcher for the New York Yankees and the St. Louis Browns over a seven-season career from 1933 to 1939, who made history in his debut pitching a four-hit shutout against the Washington Senators, 16–0, while recording four hits in four at-bats, becoming the only American League pitcher ever to get four hits in his major league debut, as well as one of only seven players in AL history to do so in a debut game, being the last the Hall of Famer Kirby Puckett, who registered four singles in his first MLB appearance with the Minnesota Twins in 1984.

October 12 – Norm Cash, 51, first baseman who appeared in just 71 games with the Chicago White White Sox from 1958 to 1959 before becoming a fixture of the Detroit Tigers for the next 15 years, winning the American League batting title with a .361 average in 1961 and gaining a World Series ring in 1968, being selected to five All-Star Games, collecting 40 home runs and 132 RBI in 1961, 30 or more homers four more times and at least 20 in six seasons, as he holds Tigers career defensive records at first base in games (1,912), putouts (14,926), assists (1,303), double plays (1,328) and fielding average (.992), while his 373 home runs with the Tigers rank second in franchise history behind Al Kaline (399).
October 15 – Larry Kopf, 95, shortstop who played with four different teams in a span of ten seasons from 1913 to 1923, as well as a member of the 1919 World Series Champions Reds, whose  greatest single feat came at Weeghman Park in 1917, when he broke up the famous double no-hit game pitched by Hippo Vaughn of the Chicago Cubs and Fred Toney of the Reds, as Kopf hit a one-out single in the 10th inning, advanced to second base on an error by center fielder Cy Williams, and later scored on an infield hit by legendary Jim Thorpe, being able to beat the throw to home plate and score the game's only run, while Toney completed his no-hitter in the bottom of the inning for a 1–0 Reds victory.
October 19 – George Pipgras, 86, American League starting pitcher, umpire and scout, who played for the New York Yankees and the Boston Red Sox over 11 seasons spanning 1923–1935, leading the American League with 24 wins, 38 starts and  innings in 1928, also winning four World Series rings with the Yankees between 1923 and 1932, while umpiring from 1939 to 1945, including officiating in the 1944 World Series as well as the 1940 All-Star Game, finishing his baseball career supervising umpires from 1946 to 1949 and working as a scout for the Red Sox.
October 23 – Paul Gehrman, 74, pitcher for the 1937 Cincinnati Reds.
October 26 – Ed Holley, 87, pitcher who played with the Chicago Cubs, Philadelphia Phillies and Pittsburgh Pirates over part of four seasons spanning 1928–1934.

November
November   3 – John Middleton, 86, pitcher for the Cleveland Indians in its 1922 season.
November 10 – Doc Sykes, 94, pitcher in the Negro leagues and Black baseball between 1914 and 1924; became a dentist and practiced in Alabama and Maryland after his playing career.
November 12 – Rocky Stone, 68, pitcher who played for the Cincinnati Reds in 1943.
November 12 – Joe Strong, 84, pitcher/outfielder and graduate of Wilberforce University who appeared for eight Negro leagues teams between 1922 and 1937; twice led his circuit's pitchers in earned run average, and batted .268 lifetime.
November 13 – Dixie Upright, 60, slugging minor league first baseman who made nine appearances as a pinch-hitter by the St. Louis Browns in 1953, going 2-for-8 with a home run, one RBI and three runs scored.
November 13 – Les Webber, 71. pitcher who played for the Brooklyn Dodgers and the Cleveland Indians in part of six seasons spanning 1942–1948.
November 30 – Roy Bruner, 69, one of many ballplayers who interrupted their careers to serve during wartime, pitching for the Philadelphia Phillies from 1939 through 1941 before becoming a bomber pilot with the rank of lieutenant, flying in 50 missions in Europe while being shut down on at least one occasion.

December
December   3 – Bob Moorhead, 48, original New York Met and the second pitcher in franchise history, relieving starter Roger Craig in the fourth inning on Opening Day, April 11, 1962; appeared in 38 games for the hapless 1962 Mets and nine more for the 1965 edition.
December   5 – George Abrams, 87, pitcher who made three relief appearances for the Cincinnati Reds in its 1923 season.
December   7 – John Bogart, 86, pitcher who played with the Detroit Tigers in 1920.  
December   8 – Pip Koehler, 84, part-time outfielder for the 1925 New York Giants.
December 10 – Si Burick, 77, sportswriter for the Dayton Daily News for 58 years, who covered the Cincinnati Reds and became the first writer from a non-major league city to be honored by the Hall of Fame with the J. G. Taylor Spink Award.
December 12 – Johnny Wyrostek, 67, two-time All-Star outfielder for the Philadelphia Phillies and Cincinnati Reds over 11 seasons between 1942 and 1954.
December 16 – Jake Caulfield, 69, backup shortstop for the 1946 Philadelphia Athletics.
December 18 – Bill Shanner, 92, pitcher who made one appearance for the Philadelphia Athletics in its 1920 season.
December 19 – Al Stokes, 86, catcher who played from 1925 to 1926 for the Boston Red Sox.
December 20 – Joe DeSa, 27, Puerto Rican first baseman who played with the St. Louis Cardinals in 1980 and for the Chicago White Sox in 1985.
December 23 – Dan Wilson, 71, five-time All-Star as an outfielder for five Negro leagues clubs between 1936 and 1947; brother of Emmett Wilson.
December 27 – Jack Wallaesa, 67 part-time shortstop for the Philadelphia Athletics and Chicago White Sox in a span of five seasons from 1940 to 1948.
Decomber 28 – Harry Else, 80, catcher for the Memphis Red Sox, Kansas City Monarchs and Chicago American Giants of the Negro leagues between 1932 and 1940.
December 31 – Provine Bradley, 79, pitcher/second baseman/outfielder for the Cincinnati Tigers and Memphis Red Sox of the Negro American League in 1937–1938.

References

External links

Major League Baseball official website 
Minor League Baseball official website
Baseball Almanac – Major League Baseball Players Who Died in 1986